College Township is one of the twenty-two townships of Knox County, Ohio, United States.  The 2010 census found 2,731 people in the township, 340 of whom lived in the unincorporated portions of the township.

Geography
Located in the central part of the county, it borders the following townships:
Monroe Township - north
Howard Township - northeast corner
Harrison Township - east
Pleasant Township - south and west

The village of Gambier is located in central College Township.

Name and history
College Township was established in 1838. It was named for Kenyon College in Gambier.

It is the only College Township statewide.

Government
The township is governed by a three-member board of trustees, who are elected in November of odd-numbered years to a four-year term beginning on the following January 1. Two are elected in the year after the presidential election and one is elected in the year before it. There is also an elected township fiscal officer, who serves a four-year term beginning on April 1 of the year after the election, which is held in November of the year before the presidential election. Vacancies in the fiscal officership or on the board of trustees are filled by the remaining trustees.

References

External links
County website

Townships in Knox County, Ohio
Townships in Ohio